, doing business as , is a Japanese drugstore chain headquartered on the third floor of the  in Nishikata, Bunkyō, Tokyo. Tomod's sells cosmetics and other products. Tomod's is a Sumitomo group company.

References

External links

 Tomod's 

Pharmacy brands
Retail companies based in Tokyo